Cryptanthus fosterianus is a plant species in the genus Cryptanthus. This species is endemic to Brazil.

Cultivars
 Cryptanthus 'Australian Sunrise'
 Cryptanthus 'Autumn Tones'
 Cryptanthus 'Beef Steak'
 Cryptanthus 'Big Brown'
 Cryptanthus 'Bits of Silver'
 Cryptanthus 'Black Joe'
 Cryptanthus 'Blush Kay'
 Cryptanthus 'Breakaway'
 Cryptanthus 'Bronze Beauty Kay'
 Cryptanthus 'Burgundy Beauty Kay'
 Cryptanthus 'Burgundy Glow Kay'
 Cryptanthus 'Burgundy Ripple Kay'
 Cryptanthus 'Candy Beauty Kay'
 Cryptanthus 'Cheerful'
 Cryptanthus 'Cloudcover'
 Cryptanthus 'Coral Bates'
 Cryptanthus 'Crystal Jackson'
 Cryptanthus 'Dark Fire'
 Cryptanthus 'Dark Light'
 Cryptanthus 'Dark Star'
 Cryptanthus 'Deloris Will'
 Cryptanthus 'Dusty Kay'
 Cryptanthus 'Ebb Tide'
 Cryptanthus 'Elaine'
 Cryptanthus 'Eureka'
 Cryptanthus 'Evelyn'
 Cryptanthus 'First Snowfall'
 Cryptanthus 'Foster's Lace'
 Cryptanthus 'Foster's Zone'
 Cryptanthus 'Frosted Beauty'
 Cryptanthus 'Frostie Kay'
 Cryptanthus 'Gladys Kay'
 Cryptanthus 'Glory Kay'
 Cryptanthus 'Graciela Lopez'
 Cryptanthus 'Grey Glow Kay'
 Cryptanthus 'Grey Haze Kay'
 Cryptanthus 'Greyling'
 Cryptanthus 'Houston'
 Cryptanthus 'Hurricane'
 Cryptanthus 'Hush'
 Cryptanthus 'Indian Maid (Maiden)'
 Cryptanthus 'Jeanie Kay'
 Cryptanthus 'Jedda'
 Cryptanthus 'Joan'
 Cryptanthus 'Joe'
 Cryptanthus 'John T. Files'
 Cryptanthus 'Koning'
 Cryptanthus 'Lime Frost'
 Cryptanthus 'Lime 'N Tan'
 Cryptanthus 'Lyric'
 Cryptanthus 'MacFoster'
 Cryptanthus 'MacGregor'
 Cryptanthus 'Madgan'
 Cryptanthus 'Madness'
 Cryptanthus 'Margaret'
 Cryptanthus 'Maroochy'
 Cryptanthus 'Medusa'
 Cryptanthus 'Melanie'
 Cryptanthus 'Midnight Kay'
 Cryptanthus 'Mistic Gem Kay'
 Cryptanthus 'Moonbeam'
 Cryptanthus 'Moonlight'
 Cryptanthus 'Music'
 Cryptanthus 'Norma'
 Cryptanthus 'Over The Moon'
 Cryptanthus 'Pat'
 Cryptanthus 'Peppered Bronze'
 Cryptanthus 'Perfection Kay'
 Cryptanthus 'Pink Brocade'
 Cryptanthus 'Pink Pants'
 Cryptanthus 'Pride of Place'
 Cryptanthus 'Racinae'
 Cryptanthus 'Racine Foster'
 Cryptanthus 'Rage'
 Cryptanthus 'Red Beauty'
 Cryptanthus 'Red Frost'
 Cryptanthus 'Reverie'
 Cryptanthus 'Ripple Haze Kay'
 Cryptanthus 'Ripple Wine Kay'
 Cryptanthus 'Rosy Kay'
 Cryptanthus 'Rosy Mottle Kay'
 Cryptanthus 'Scotch Mist'
 Cryptanthus 'Sea Song'
 Cryptanthus 'Seven Veils'
 Cryptanthus 'Shockwave'
 Cryptanthus 'Silver Dust Kay'
 Cryptanthus 'Silver Song'
 Cryptanthus 'Silver Waves Kay'
 Cryptanthus 'Sing Song'
 Cryptanthus 'Smokie Kay'
 Cryptanthus 'Soft Shades'
 Cryptanthus 'Soft Shadows'
 Cryptanthus 'Sophia'
 Cryptanthus 'Southern Star'
 Cryptanthus 'Spellbound'
 Cryptanthus 'Stained Glass'
 Cryptanthus 'Starfish'
 Cryptanthus 'Sugar Coated Chocolate'
 Cryptanthus 'Sylvie Langdon'
 Cryptanthus 'Symphony'
 Cryptanthus 'Twirl'
 Cryptanthus 'Wild Honey'
 Cryptanthus 'Zodiac'
 xNeotanthus 'Coco Loco'
 xNeotanthus 'Coconut Grove'

References

BSI Cultivar Registry Retrieved 11 October 2009

fosterianus
Flora of Brazil